The Lodestar Award for Best Young Adult Book is an award given annually to a book published for young adult readers in the field of science fiction or fantasy. The name of the award was chosen because a lodestar is "a star that guides or leads, especially in navigation, where it is the sole reliable source of light—the star that leads those in uncharted waters to safety." The nomination and selection process is administered by the World Science Fiction Society (WSFS), and the award is presented at the Hugo Award ceremony at the annual World Science Fiction Convention, or Worldcon, although it is not itself a Hugo Award.

Lodestar Award nominees and winners, using the same procedures as the Hugo Awards, are chosen by supporting or attending members of the Worldcon, and the presentation evening constitutes its central event. The final selection process is defined in the WSFS Constitution as instant-runoff voting with six nominees, except in the case of a tie. The books on the ballot are the six most-nominated by members that year, with no limit on the number of books that can be nominated. Initial nominations are made by members from January through March, while voting on the ballot of six nominations is performed roughly from April through July, depending on the dates of that year's Worldcon. Worldcons are generally held in August or early September, and are held in a different city around the world each year.

Prior to the creation of the award, unsuccessful attempts had been made to add a Best Young Adult Book or similar category to the Hugo Awards, leading to the creation of a WSFS committee in 2014 to make recommendations on the issue. The committee concluded in 2017 that opposition to the category was largely due to its nature as a type of story rather than a format, like the other categories, and proposed making it a named non-Hugo award instead. This proposal was agreed upon by the WSFS members. The award was created and named in separate amendments to the WSFS constitution, in 2017 and 2018 respectively, so it did not have a formal name in its inaugural year, and was referred to as the World Science Fiction Society Award for Best Young Adult Book.

In the five years the award has been given, 22 authors have had works nominated. Each year has seen a different winner: the 2018 award was won by Nnedi Okorafor, the 2019 award by Tomi Adeyemi, the 2020 award by Naomi Kritzer, the 2021 award by Ursula Vernon under the alias T. Kingfisher, and the 2022 award by Naomi Novik. Vernon has had works nominated three times (as Kingfisher), and six other authors have been nominated twice.

Winners and finalists
In the following table, the years correspond to the date of the ceremony, rather than when the novel was first published. Each year links to the corresponding "year in literature". Entries with a blue background have won the award; those with a white background are the finalists.

  *   Winners

See also
 Andre Norton Award

References

2018 establishments in the United States
American literary awards
American speculative fiction awards
Awards established in 2018
Fantasy awards
Lists of speculative fiction-related award winners and nominees
Science fiction awards
Worldcon